Tory Boy was a character in a television sketch by comedian Harry Enfield which portrayed a young, male, Conservative MP. The term has since been used as a caricature of young Conservatives. Tory Boy was a repulsive thirteen-year-old who held glaringly outdated beliefs about society and the world in general. Enfield created the character based on a snobbish, unpopular boy with whom he went to school, and a younger version of William Hague, who was a prominent member of the Young Conservatives group since he was a teenager and famously made a speech at the Conservative Party's annual national conference when he was just 16 years old. Enfield also claimed to have mixed other contemporary Conservative politicians such as Michael Howard and Michael Portillo into the character, alleging that they were "Tory Boys who have never grown up." The traits of "Tory Boy" have also been said to mirror those of a stereotypical member of the Federation of Conservative Students. 

The Tory Boy image of a young Conservative MP has damaged some politicians. William Hague struggled to shake off the stereotype and was often ridiculed for it both before and during his leadership of the party. In 2006, an article in The Daily Telegraph, a Conservative-supporting newspaper, claimed that Conservative Future "had managed to change the image of young Conservatives" from that given by the FCS.

In Enfield's 1997 TV Christmas Special, some months after Labour's landslide victory in the UK General Election, a sketch included Tory Boy's left-wing father wishing that his son would join the Labour Party. The fairy at the top of their Christmas tree grants his wish and with her magic wand she transforms Tory Boy into "Tony Boy" (a parody of Tony Blair).

References

Further reading
 William Hague, From Tory Boy to Tory Leader,

External links
 Catching up with the 'Tory boy'

Political terms in the United Kingdom
Comedy television characters
Conservative Party (UK) terms
Harry Enfield